Adhemir de Barros (born March 21, 1942 in Cambará, Paraná, Brazil), best known as Paraná, was an association footballer. He played at São Bento, São Paulo, Londrina, and Brazil national football team, which had participated at 1966 FIFA World Cup, playing one match.

References

1942 births
Living people
Brazilian footballers
São Paulo FC players
1966 FIFA World Cup players
Brazil international footballers

Association football forwards